Serdika Center Sofia is a shopping mall located in Sofia, Bulgaria, opened in the spring of 2010 and has more than 210 stores. Serdika Center Sofia is located on Sitnyakovo Boulevard in the municipality of Oborishte. The shopping mall is a 5-minute drive from Sofia's main motorway Trakiya, 10 minutes from Sofia Airport and 10 minutes from the central part of Sofia.

See also 
 List of malls in Sofia

External links
Official website

Shopping malls in Sofia
Commercial buildings completed in 2010
Shopping malls established in 2010
2010 establishments in Bulgaria